Alexandra Anna Daddario (born March 16, 1986) is an American actress. She had her breakthrough portraying Annabeth Chase in the Percy Jackson film series (2010–2013). She has since starred as Paige in Hall Pass (2011), Heather Miller in Texas Chainsaw 3D (2013), Blake Gaines in San Andreas (2015), Summer Quinn in Baywatch (2017), and Alexis Butler in We Summon the Darkness (2019). She has also guest starred in television series such as White Collar, It's Always Sunny in Philadelphia, True Detective, New Girl, and American Horror Story: Hotel. In 2021, she starred in the first season of the HBO series The White Lotus, for which she received widespread critical acclaim and an Emmy nomination for Outstanding Supporting Actress in a Limited or Anthology Series or Movie in 2022.

Early life and education 
Alexandra Anna Daddario was born in New York City on March 16, 1986, the eldest child of Christina, a lawyer, and Richard Daddario, a prosecutor and former head of the New York City Police Department counterterrorism unit. She is of Italian, Irish, English, and Hungarian descent. She has a younger brother, Matthew Daddario, and a younger sister, who are both actors as well. Her paternal grandfather was Emilio Q. Daddario, a Democratic member of the U.S. House of Representatives for Connecticut from 1959 to 1971.

Daddario was raised on Manhattan's Upper East Side. She attended Brearley School and the Professional Children's School. Daddario said she decided to be an actress at the age of 11. "I always loved storytelling," she stated in 2019. "It was just something I genuinely wanted to do – and I could've done anything, really. I did have every opportunity on the planet." She attended Marymount Manhattan College before dropping out to pursue acting full-time. She has studied the Meisner acting technique for years.

Acting career

2010–2015: Early work and recognition
Daddario made her television debut at the age of 15, when she played victimized girl Laurie Lewis in the ABC daytime soap opera All My Children. Her first major role was as Annabeth Chase in the fantasy adventure film Percy Jackson & the Olympians: The Lightning Thief (2010). She also had a recurring role as Neal Caffrey's love interest, Kate Moreau, in the USA Network procedural drama series White Collar. In 2011, she appeared in the comedy film Hall Pass and had a recurring role as Rachel in NBC's comedy-drama series Parenthood.

In 2012, Daddario starred in the music video for Imagine Dragons' song "Radioactive", which surpassed 1 billion views on YouTube. She appeared as a guest in an episode of the FX sitcom It's Always Sunny in Philadelphia, in which she portrayed Ruby Taft. Her first starring role after Percy Jackson was as lead character Heather Miller in the slasher film Texas Chainsaw 3D (2013). In August 2013, Daddario reprised her role as Annabeth Chase in the film sequel Percy Jackson: Sea of Monsters. She then appeared in the romantic horror comedy Burying the Ex. Burying the Ex premiered out of competition as the Venice Film Festival in 2014.

In January 2013, Daddario was cast in the first season of the HBO anthology series True Detective. She appeared in a four-episode arc as Lisa Tragnetti, a court reporter having an extramarital affair with one of the main characters. Her nude scenes in the series attracted much attention. The following year, she had a lead role as Blake Gaines in the disaster film San Andreas and made a cameo appearance in the pilot of the Fox comedy series The Last Man on Earth.  That same year, she made a guest appearance on American Horror Story: Hotel, portraying a fictionalized version of designer Natacha Rambova.

2016–2020: Breakthrough
In 2016, Daddario had a supporting role in the Nicholas Sparks romantic drama film The Choice, directed by Ross Katz. Daddario subsequently starred as one of the leads in the film adaptation of Baywatch (2017). She played Summer Quinn, who was portrayed by Nicole Eggert in the original television series. That same year, Daddario portrayed Kate Jeffries in the road trip comedy The Layover (2017), directed by William H. Macy.

In 2018, Daddario appeared in the music video "Wait" by Maroon 5 and starred as Avery Martin in the romantic comedy When We First Met, opposite the film's co-writer Adam DeVine. Daddario made a cameo appearance as a scuba diver in Rampage, directed by San Andreas filmmaker Brad Peyton, but her scenes were cut from the final film. Daddario starred as Constance Blackwood in We Have Always Lived in the Castle, a film adaptation of Shirley Jackson's mystery thriller novel of the same name. Daddario also starred in the psychological thriller Night Hunter, which premiered at the LA Film Festival on September 28, 2018. In 2019, Daddario starred in and produced two films, the romantic comedy Can You Keep a Secret?, based on the novel of the same name by Sophie Kinsella, and the horror thriller We Summon the Darkness, directed by Marc Meyers.

In 2020, Daddario provided the voice of Lois Lane in the superhero animated film Superman: Man of Tomorrow and starred in the noir film Lost Girls & Love Hotels. She also appeared in Songbird, the first film shot in Los Angeles during the COVID-19 pandemic.

2021–present: The White Lotus and mainstream recognition
In 2021 she appeared in the HBO social satire series The White Lotus and the film Die in a Gunfight. For her performance in the former, she received widespread critical acclaim alongside the rest of the cast, with The Hollywood Reporter declaring that her performance "should redefine how audiences and casting directors see her." She was nominated for the Primetime Emmy Award for Outstanding Supporting Actress in a Limited or Anthology Series or Movie in 2022.

Daddario starred in the 2022 coming-of-age film Wildflower. Beginning in 2023, she starred in the AMC series Mayfair Witches, based on the Anne Rice novel series Lives of the Mayfair Witches.

Personal life 
Since 2019, she has been in a relationship with producer Andrew Form. On December 2, 2021, they announced their engagement. The pair married in June 2022.

Filmography

Film

Television

Web

Music videos

Video games

Awards and nominations

References

External links 

 
 

1986 births
Living people
Daddario family
21st-century American actresses
Actresses from New York City
American child actresses
American film actresses
American people of Czech descent
American people of English descent
American people of Irish descent
American people of Italian descent
American people of Slovak descent
American soap opera actresses
American television actresses
American video game actresses
American voice actresses
Brearley School alumni
Marymount Manhattan College alumni
People from the Upper East Side